Anti-sweatshop movement refers to campaigns to improve the conditions of workers in sweatshops, i.e. manufacturing places characterized by low wages, poor working conditions and often child labor. It started in the 19th century in industrialized countries such as the United States, Australia, New Zealand and the United Kingdom to improve the conditions of workers in those countries.

History 
Some of the earliest sweatshop critics were found in the 19th-century abolitionist movement that had originally coalesced in opposition to chattel slavery, and many abolitionists saw similarities between slavery and sweatshop work. As slavery was successively outlawed in industrial countries between 1794 (in France) and 1865 (in the United States), some abolitionists sought to broaden the anti-slavery consensus to include other forms of harsh labor, including sweatshops. As it happened, the first significant law to address sweatshops (the Factory Act of 1833) was passed in the United Kingdom at the same time that the slave trade (1807) and ownership of slaves (1833) were made illegal.

Ultimately, the abolitionist movement split apart. Some advocates focused on working conditions and found common cause with trade unions and Marxists and socialist political groups, or progressive movement and the muckrakers. Others focused on the continued slave trade and involuntary servitude in the colonial world. For those groups that remained focused on slavery, sweatshops became one of the primary objects of controversy. Workplaces across multiple sectors of the economy were categorized as sweatshops. However, there were fundamental philosophical disagreements about what constituted slavery. Unable to agree on the status of sweatshops, the abolitionists working with the League of Nations and the United Nations ultimately backed away from efforts to define slavery, and focused instead on a common precursor of slavery – human trafficking.

Those focused on working conditions included Friedrich Engels, whose book The Condition of the Working Class in England in 1844 would inspire the Marxist movement named for his collaborator, Karl Marx. In the United Kingdom the Factory Act was revised six further times between 1844 and 1878 to help improve the condition of workers by limiting work hours and the use of child labor. The formation of the International Labour Organization in 1919 under the League of Nations and then the United Nations sought to address the plight of workers the world over. Concern over working conditions as described by muckraker journalists during the Progressive Era in the United States saw the passage of new workers rights laws and ultimately resulted in the Fair Labor Standards Act of 1938, passed during the New Deal.

In the late 20th century, with the advent of globalization, movements were formed to protest the exploitation of workers in poorer countries by companies based in wealthy countries. Noam Chomsky said in The Nation that the anti-sweatshop movement is in some ways, he said, "like the Anti-Apartheid Movement, except that in this case it's striking at the core of the relations of exploitation. It's another example of how different constituencies are working together."  On February 4, 1997, Mayor Ed Boyle of North Olmsted, Ohio, introduced the first piece of legislation actually prohibiting the government of purchasing, renting, or taking on consignment any and all goods made under sweatshop conditions and including in the definition those goods made by political prisoners. This legislation was copied by other American cities such as Detroit, New York, and San Francisco. Later Mayor Boyle introduced the legislation to the Mayors and Managers Association where it was immediately passed and he was invited by President Clinton to address a panel studying the subject in Washington, DC.

With the rise of globalization and transnational corporations (TNCs) such as Nike or Gap, many sweatshop laborers have lost autonomy and corporations have gained in their invincibility to anti-sweatshop laws within a particular country. Corporations have the ability to move their production to another country when the laws become too restricting. As corporations globalize, many sweatshop movements have begun to see "worker internationalization" as one of the only viable solution; however, this requires strong labor movements, sufficient resources, and a commitment to mobilizing all workers, including women, which can be difficult to do at an international scale, as has been the case in the Americas.

#WhoMadeMyClothes 
The #WhoMadeMyClothes hashtag was launched in 2013 by Fashion Revolution co-founders, Carry Somers and Orsola de Castro. Celebrities including Emma Watson, Kelly Slater, and Fernanda Paes Leme used the hashtag on Twitter to support the issue.

The movement also utilized YouTube to spread awareness. To promote the hashtag in 2015, Fashion Revolution released a video titled “The 2 Euro T-Shirt - A Social Experiment". The video showed a vending machine selling T-shirts for 2 Euros. When people went to purchase the shirt, a video played describing the working conditions in which the shirt was made. By the end, people chose to donate to the cause of increasing supply chain transparency instead of buying the T-shirt. The video has over 7.9 million views. Their 2018 campaign film uploaded on April 22, 2018, was awarded the Best Green Fashion Film award at the Fashion Film Festival Milano and has over 54,000 views to date.

Effectiveness of the movement 
A study published in 2011 found that while in most cases anti-sweatshop movements did not affect sales for companies using sweatshops, they did correspond with a decrease in the sales of well-known, more specialized brands and more intense movements caused more significant reduction in the sales.  The same study also found that anti-sweatshop events also seemed to correspond with lower stock prices for the companies that were the target of these events, though some major anti-sweatshop events such the Kaksy lawsuit against Nike, did not result in any discernible change in stock price of the targeted company.  The study found that 64.1% of the companies targeted by anti-sweatshop movements saw drops in stock price in the five days following the anti-sweatshop event, and 56.4% saw drops in the two days following the event.  Though the study did find these slight negative economic effects, it did not find that, when taking into account companies of all reputations, anti-sweatshop movements or events damaged the reputation of the companies they targeted to a statistically significant degree; however, there does seem to be a slight undercutting of the reputations of companies with positive reputations when they are faced with anti-sweatshop campaigns, particularly intense ones.

Debate on the effects of sweatshops

Criticisms

Safety Regulations 
The criticisms of sweatshops, and thus the reason for an anti-sweatshop movement, begins with the lack of safety regulations in sweatshops and their exploitative nature. Matt Zwolinski argues that though sweatshop laborers technically "choose" to work in sweatshops, this decision is not "fully voluntary" and that while sweatshops may provide opportunities that would not otherwise exist, when a worker "consents" to work in a sweatshop, they are also consenting to labor practices that cause more harm than good to the laborer overall. Another criticism includes the prevalence of child labor working heavy machinery for very low wages. This often requires children to be taken out of school, thus disrupting their education, and exposing them to very dangerous working conditions that may endanger their health.

Globalization 
In recent years, the apparel industry has become increasingly globalized which has caused production to move abroad. Over 850,000 jobs were lost in developed countries but that number was matched by growth in the Third World. Four-fifths of the employment growth occurred in Asian countries- Bangladesh, Thailand, Indonesia- while the highest number of clothing job losses were in the United States. Although many anti-sweatshop campaigners would like for globalization to be reversed and factories to close, citizens of these developed countries do not have many options for alternative work. In developing countries, the primary alternative work consists of lower-wage agriculture. Other criticisms include advocating for humane globalization. This advocacy includes making a distinction between cost of living and the parallel to wage. For example, it does not cost a citizen the same to live in Bangladesh as in Europe.

Low wages 
While many sweatshop workers have higher wages compared to other industry workers such as agriculture, they are still exploited by brands and corporations that take an advantage of low wage standards in third world countries. For example, according to Bangladeshi labor organizations, the average living wage in Bangladesh is about $60 per month. Sweatshop workers in Bangladesh are paid about $40 a month. Companies outsource manufacturing labor from rich to poor countries because of the appeal of cheap labor and low costs. Although sweatshop work wages do not necessarily meet the living wage standards, poor workers in such developing countries rely on these companies, because it provides a primary source of work that pays more than others.

Arguments in favor

Provision of opportunities 
Some people, such as Pulitzer Prize-winning journalist Nicholas Kristoff, argue that the anti-sweatshop movement "risks harming the very people it is aiming to help." This is because sweatshops signify the start of an industrial revolution in China and offer people a path towards making money and escaping poverty.  The anti-sweatshop movement, in this view, can harm the impoverished workers by increasing labour costs for factories which, in turn, can incentivize turning to technology instead of people for labour and thus reduce the number of employees needed.  Additionally, if anti-sweatshop movements succeed and manage to get stricter guidelines passed, companies may move to countries with less strict laws governing sweatshops, thus removing a source of jobs and money for impoverished countries.

Effects on employment 
Even if a company does not move to another country with more relaxed labor laws, economic demand theory says that the more a good cost, the less the demand for it is. Economists argue that even though the labor is "exploitative", it should be permitted, as trying to put regulations on sweatshop labor would only result in sweatshops needing fewer workers, thus reducing opportunities for individuals to make a living.

Views of economists 
Most economists say that sweatshops can be a benefit to Third World workers and the anti-sweatshop movement could reduce Third World employment and investment. The economic ways to think about this issue, employers and employees can both get benefits when they voluntarily sign the contract, no matter how low the wages are from the external's point of view. An economist pointed out "as simple as this: 'Either you believe labor demand curves are downward sloping, or you don't,' as a neoclassical colleague said to me. Of course, not to believe that demand curves are negatively sloped would be tantamount to declaring yourself an economic illiterate."

Organizations 
 Clean Clothes Campaign - international alliance of labor unions and non-governmental organizations
 Fashion Revolution - organization that brings awareness to the ethical, humanitarian, and sustainable issues of global fast fashion brands
 Free the Children - a Canadian organization that helps raise awareness and put a stop to Child Labour – Also helps other children in need
 Global Exchange - an international human rights organization founded in 1988 dedicated to promoting social, economic and environmental justice
 Green America - membership organization based in the United States
 Institute for Global Labour and Human Rights - founded to combat sweatshop labor and US government policy in El Salvador and Central America
 International Labor Rights Forum
 International Labour Organization - a specialized agency of the United Nations
 Maquila Solidarity Network - a Canadian anti-sweatshop network
 Rugmark - a carpet labeling program and rehabilitation centers for former child laborers in India, Pakistan and Nepal
 UNITE HERE - a labor union based in the United States and Canada dedicated to achieving higher standards for laborers 
 United Students Against Sweatshops - a student organization in the United States and Canada
 Worker Rights Consortium - a labor rights organization focused on protecting the rights of workers who make apparel in the United States

In Asia 
 China Labour Bulletin - reports on labor concerns in China
 Hong Kong Christian Industrial Committee - empowers workers, acts as a policy watch-dog, and promotes independent trade union movements

Prominent campaigners
 Lady Astor
 Alfred Deakin
 Alfred George Gardiner
 Vida Goldstein
 Florence Kelley
 Charles Kernaghan
 Mary Reid Macarthur
 Samuel Mauger
 R. H. Tawney
 Rutherford Waddell

See also
 Child labour
 Craftivism#Anti-sweatshop
 Nicholas D. Kristof#Criticism of the anti-sweatshop movement
 National Anti-Sweating League
 National Labor Committee in Support of Human and Worker Rights
 Sweatshop#Anti-sweatshop movement

References

Reform movements
Minimum wage
Manufacturing
Labour law
Ethically disputed working conditions
Anti-corporate activism